Margherita di Savoia is a town and comune in the Province of Barletta-Andria-Trani (Apulia, southern Italy). It was given this name in 1879 in honour of Queen Margherita of Savoy, previously it had been known as Saline di Barletta.

References

External links